Miloš Tichý (born 1966 in Počátky) is a Czech astronomer.

He is a prolific discoverer of asteroids. He also discovered the periodic comet 196P/Tichý. He works together with his ex-wife at Kleť Observatory. Asteroid 3337 Miloš is named after him.

Discoveries

List of discovered comets

List of discovered minor planets

See also

References

External links 
 Homepage

1966 births
Living people
People from Počátky
20th-century astronomers
Czech astronomers
Discoverers of asteroids
Discoverers of comets